Malungisa Dlamini (born 3 April 1978) is a Swaziland international footballer who plays as a midfielder. As of February 2010, he plays for Young Buffaloes in the Swazi Premier League and has won 10 caps and scored one goal for his country.

External links

1978 births
Living people
Swazi footballers
Eswatini international footballers
Association football midfielders
Young Buffaloes F.C. players